Jausa is a village in Hiiumaa Parish, Hiiu County in northwestern Estonia.

The village is first mentioned in 1564 (Joosz dorp). Historically, the village was part of Aadma Manor, and Putkaste Manor.

The southwestern part of the village is known as Remmaots.

References
 

Villages in Hiiu County